The 1966 All-Ireland Junior Hurling Championship was the 45th staging of the All-Ireland Junior Championship since its establishment by the Gaelic Athletic Association in 1912.

Galway entered the championship as the defending champions, however, they were beaten by Down in the All-Ireland semi-final.

The All-Ireland final was played on 23 October 1966 at the Gaelic Grounds in Limerick, between London and Cork, in what was their second ever meeting in the final. London won the match by 1–06 to 0–08 to claim their second championship title overall and a first tile in 28 years.

Results

All-Ireland Junior Football Championship

All-Ireland semi-finals

All-Ireland home final

All-Ireland final

References

Junior
All-Ireland Junior Football Championship